The 1921–22 Kansas Jayhawks men's basketball team represented the University of Kansas during the 1921–22 NCAA men's basketball season in the United States. The head coach was Phog Allen, coaching in his fifth overall season with the Jayhawks. The team finished the season with a 16–2 record and was retroactively named national champions by the Helms Athletic Foundation. This was Kansas' first of two consecutive Helms national championships.

Team captain and senior forward George E. Rody led the team and the Missouri Valley Conference in scoring with a 14.7 average. Rody was awarded the “first team captaincy” of the All Conference team, the forerunner of the Conference “Most Valuable Player” award. Junior Paul Endacott was also named first team All Conference and was retroactively declared a consensus All-American by the Helms Foundation. The team also included standout sophomore Charlie T. Black and reserve junior Adolph Rupp, who later went on to a Hall of Fame coaching career at Kentucky.

Roster
Waldo Bowman
Paul Endacott
Armin F. Woestemeyer
Byron Frederick
Andrew McDonald
George Rody
Adolph Rupp
Charlie T. Black
John Wulf

Schedule and results

|-
!colspan=9 style="background:#00009C; color:red;"| Regular season

Source

References

Kansas Jayhawks men's basketball seasons
NCAA Division I men's basketball tournament championship seasons
Kansas
Kansas Jayhawks Men's Basketball Team
Kansas Jayhawks Men's Basketball Team